An Interlocking machine room (IMR) is a component of the London Underground signalling system. Interlocking is an arrangement of signal apparatus that prevents conflicting movements through an arrangement of tracks such as junctions or crossings. On the London Underground signals and points are operated and controlled by an array of electrical, pneumatic and mechanical components. IMRs are unmanned and generally located adjacent to points or at platform ends, and provide a secure and weatherproof enclosure for pneumatically controlled mechanically and electrically interlocked levers mounted horizontally in an upright lever-frame or with a converted manual lever frame.
 

The table below is an alphabetical listing of the extant Interlocking Machine Rooms on the London Underground network in August 2019.

As London Underground train control is modernised and updated some Interlocking Machine Rooms are made redundant. The table below is an alphabetical listing of the IMRs on the London Underground network that were operational in 1994 but had been decommissioned by April 2022.

See also
Interlocking

Liverpool Street signal box

References

Interlocking systems
Railway signalling in the United Kingdom